Charles Jaggard (born 22 May 1973) is an English former cricketer. He was a left-handed batsman who played for Buckinghamshire. He was born in Chalfont St. Peter.

Jaggard appeared in the Minor Counties Championship for the first time in 1995, and made a single List A appearance, against Essex in the NatWest Trophy in 1997. He scored 28 runs in the match.

Jaggard continued to play for Buckinghamshire until 1998.

External links
Charles Jaggard at Cricket Archive 

1973 births
Living people
English cricketers
Buckinghamshire cricketers
People from Chalfont St Peter